Mikleuš is a village and municipality in Croatia in Virovitica-Podravina County. It has a population of 1,701 (2001 census), 86.6% of which are Croats. Other 13.4% are Hungarians.

Municipalities of Croatia
Populated places in Virovitica-Podravina County